Broad Valley is a descriptive name for the broad glacier-filled valley on the south side of Laclavere Plateau, Trinity Peninsula. The name was suggested by V.I. Russell of the Falkland Islands Dependencies Survey following his survey in 1946.

References
 

Valleys of Graham Land
Landforms of Trinity Peninsula